The 2014–15 Philadelphia Flyers season was the 48th season for the National Hockey League franchise that was established on June 5, 1967. For the second time in three years, the Flyers failed to qualify for the playoffs.

Off-season
On April 15, 2014, the Flyers re-signed 27-year-old impending unrestricted free agent Andrew MacDonald to a six-year extension for $30 million to keep the defenseman under contract through the 2019–20 NHL season.

On May 7, 2014, Paul Holmgren was promoted to President of the Flyers and Ron Hextall was promoted to general manager.

On June 23, 2014, Hextall's first major move as general manager was to trade Scott Hartnell to the Columbus Blue Jackets in exchange for R. J. Umberger and a fourth-round pick in the 2015 draft. Hextall would later sign free agent defensemen Nick Schultz and Michael Del Zotto to one-year deals.

Standings

Schedule and results

Preseason

|- style="text-align:center; background:#ffc;"
| 1 || September 22 || Toronto || 3–2 || Philadelphia || SO || Stolarz || || 0–0–1 || 
|-  style="text-align:center; background:#cfc;"
| 2 || September 22 || Washington || 4–5 || Philadelphia || || Zepp || 17,679 || 1–0–1 || 
|-  style="text-align:center; background:#fcc;"
| 3 || September 23 || Philadelphia || 0–4 || Toronto || || Mason || 15,190 || 1–1–1 || 
|-  style="text-align:center; background:#cfc;"
| 4 || September 25 || New Jersey || 0–4 || Philadelphia || || Mason || 18,850 || 2–1–1 || 
|-  style="text-align:center; background:#fcc;"
| 5 || September 28 || Philadelphia || 1–3 || New Jersey || || Zepp || 10,404 || 2–2–1 || 
|-  style="text-align:center; background:#fcc;"
| 6 || September 29 || Philadelphia || 3–6 || NY Rangers || || Mason || 18,006 || 2–3–1 || 
|-  style="text-align:center; background:#cfc;"
| 7 || September 30 || NY Rangers || 2–4 || Philadelphia || || Emery || 18,865 || 3–3–1 || 
|- style="text-align:center; background:#ffc;"
| 8 || October 2 || Philadelphia || 2–3 || Washington || SO || Mason || 16,765 || 3–3–2 || 
|-
| colspan="10" style="text-align:center;"|
Notes:
 Game played at Budweiser Gardens in London, Ontario.
|-

|-
| Legend:

Regular season

|- style="text-align:center; background:#fcc;"
| 1 || October 8 || Philadelphia || 1–2 || Boston || || Mason || 17,565 || 0–1–0 || 0 || 
|- style="text-align:center; background:#fcc;"
| 2 || October 9 || New Jersey || 6–4 || Philadelphia || || Mason || 19,801 || 0–2–0 || 0 || 
|-  style="text-align:center; background:#ffc;"
| 3 || October 11 || Montreal || 4–3 || Philadelphia || SO || Emery || 19,745 || 0–2–1 || 1 || 
|-  style="text-align:center; background:#ffc;"
| 4 || October 14 || Anaheim || 4–3 || Philadelphia || SO || Mason || 19,589 || 0–2–2 || 2 || 
|-  style="text-align:center; background:#cfc;"
| 5 || October 18 || Philadelphia || 6–5 || Dallas || OT || Emery || 18,532 || 1–2–2 || 4 || 
|- style="text-align:center; background:#fcc;"
| 6 || October 21 || Philadelphia || 0–4 || Chicago || || Mason || 21,162 || 1–3–2 || 4 || 
|- style="text-align:center; background:#cfc;"
| 7 || October 22 || Philadelphia || 5–3 || Pittsburgh || || Emery || 18,661 || 2–3–2 || 6 || 
|- style="text-align:center; background:#cfc;"
| 8 || October 25 || Detroit || 2–4 || Philadelphia || || Emery || 19,867 || 3–3–2 || 8 || 
|- style="text-align:center; background:#cfc;"
| 9 || October 28 || Los Angeles || 2–3 || Philadelphia || OT || Emery || 19,873 || 4–3–2 || 10 || 
|- style="text-align:center; background:#fcc;"
| 10 || October 30 || Philadelphia || 3–4 || Tampa Bay || || Emery || 18,642 || 4–4–2 || 10 || 
|-

|- style="text-align:center; background:#fcc;"
| 11 || November 1 || Philadelphia || 1–2 || Florida || || Mason || 9,774 || 4–5–2 || 10 || 
|- style="text-align:center; background:#cfc;"
| 12 || November 4 || Edmonton || 1–4 || Philadelphia || || Mason || 19,566 || 5–5–2 || 12 || 
|- style="text-align:center; background:#cfc;"
| 13 || November 6 || Florida || 1–4 || Philadelphia || || Mason || 19,777 || 6–5–2 || 14 || 
|- style="text-align:center; background:#cfc;"
| 14 || November 8 || Colorado || 3–4 || Philadelphia || || Mason || 19,792 || 7–5–2 || 16 || 
|- style="text-align:center; background:#fcc;"
| 15 || November 14 || Columbus || 4–3 || Philadelphia || || Mason || 19,789 || 7–6–2 || 16 || 
|- style="text-align:center; background:#fcc;"
| 16 || November 15 || Philadelphia || 3–6 || Montreal || || Emery || 21,287 || 7–7–2 || 16 || 
|- style="text-align:center; background:#fcc;"
| 17 || November 19 || Philadelphia || 0–2 || NY Rangers || || Mason || 18,006 || 7–8–2 || 16 || 
|- style="text-align:center; background:#fcc;"
| 18 || November 20 || Minnesota || 3–2 || Philadelphia || || Emery || 19,919 || 7–9–2 || 16 || 
|- style="text-align:center; background:#cfc;"
| 19 || November 22 || Columbus || 2–4 || Philadelphia || || Mason || 19,846 || 8–9–2 || 18 || 
|- style="text-align:center; background:#ffc;"
| 20 || November 24 || Philadelphia || 0–1 || NY Islanders || SO || Mason || 12,409 || 8–9–3 || 19 || 
|- style="text-align:center; background:#fcc;"
| 21 || November 26 || Philadelphia || 2–5 || Detroit || || Mason || 20,027 || 8–10–3 || 19 || 
|- style="text-align:center; background:#fcc;"
| 22 || November 28 || NY Rangers || 3–0 || Philadelphia || || Mason || 19,969 || 8–11–3 || 19 || 
|- style="text-align:center; background:#fcc;"
| 23 || November 29 || Philadelphia || 2–5 || NY Rangers || || Emery || 18,006 || 8–12–3 || 19 || 
|-

|- style="text-align:center; background:#fcc;"
| 24 || December 2 || Philadelphia || 1–2 || San Jose || || Mason || 17,159 || 8–13–3 || 19 || 
|- style="text-align:center; background:#ffc;"
| 25 || December 3 || Philadelphia || 4–5 || Anaheim || SO || Mason || 15,691 || 8–13–4 || 20 || 
|- style="text-align:center; background:#cfc;"
| 26 || December 6 || Philadelphia || 2–1 || Los Angeles || || Mason || 18,230 || 9–13–4 || 22 || 
|- style="text-align:center; background:#ffc;"
| 27 || December 9 || Philadelphia || 2–3 || Columbus || OT || Mason || 14,196 || 9–13–5 || 23 || 
|- style="text-align:center; background:#cfc;"
| 28 || December 11 || New Jersey || 1–4 || Philadelphia || || Emery || 19,572 || 10–13–5 || 25 || 
|- style="text-align:center; background:#cfc;"
| 29 || December 13 || Carolina || 1–5 || Philadelphia || || Mason || 19,609 || 11–13–5 || 27 || 
|- style="text-align:center; background:#fcc;"
| 30 || December 16 || Tampa Bay || 3–1 || Philadelphia || || Mason || 19,576 || 11–14–5 || 27 || 
|- style="text-align:center; background:#ffc;"
| 31 || December 18 || Florida || 2–1 || Philadelphia || SO || Mason || 19,582 || 11–14–6 || 28 || 
|- style="text-align:center; background:#cfc;"
| 32 || December 20 || Philadelphia || 7–4 || Toronto || || Emery || 19,343 || 12–14–6 || 30 || 
|- style="text-align:center; background:#cfc;"
| 33 || December 21 || Philadelphia || 4–3 || Winnipeg || OT || Zepp || 15,016 || 13–14–6 || 32 || 
|- style="text-align:center; background:#cfc;"
| 34 || December 23 || Philadelphia || 5–2 || Minnesota || || Emery || 19,020 || 14–14–6 || 34 || 
|- style="text-align:center; background:#fcc;"
| 35 || December 27 || Philadelphia || 1–4 || Nashville || || Emery || 17,315 || 14–15–6 || 34 || 
|- style="text-align:center; background:#fcc;"
| 36 || December 29 || Philadelphia || 2–4 || Arizona || || Mason || 16,521 || 14–16–6 || 34 || 
|- style="text-align:center; background:#ffc;"
| 37 || December 31 || Philadelphia || 3–4 || Colorado || OT || Mason || 18,007 || 14–16–7 || 35 || 
|-

|- style="text-align:center; background:#fcc;"
| 38 || January 2 || Philadelphia || 1–2 || Carolina ||  || Mason || 12,682 || 14–17–7 || 35 || 
|- style="text-align:center; background:#fcc;"
| 39 || January 3 || Philadelphia || 2–5 || New Jersey ||  || Emery || 15,066 || 14–18–7 || 35 || 
|- style="text-align:center; background:#cfc;"
| 40 || January 6 || Ottawa || 1–2 || Philadelphia || SO || Mason || 19,571 || 15–18–7 || 37 || 
|- style="text-align:center; background:#cfc;"
| 41 || January 8 || Washington || 2–3 || Philadelphia || OT || Mason || 19,703 || 16–18–7 || 39 || 
|- style="text-align:center; background:#fcc;"
| 42 || January 10 || Boston || 3–1 || Philadelphia ||  || Emery || 19,907 || 16–19–7 || 39 || 
|- style="text-align:center; background:#cfc;"
| 43 || January 12 || Tampa Bay || 3–7 || Philadelphia ||  || Zepp || 19,598 || 17–19–7 || 41 || 
|- style="text-align:center; background:#fcc;"
| 44 || January 14 || Philadelphia || 0–1 || Washington ||  || Zepp || 18,506 || 17–20–7 || 41 || 
|- style="text-align:center; background:#fcc;"
| 45 || January 15 || Vancouver || 4–0 || Philadelphia ||  || Emery || 19,571 || 17–21–7 || 41 || 
|- style="text-align:center; background:#cfc;"
| 46 || January 17 || Philadelphia || 4–3 || Buffalo ||  || Zepp || 19,070 || 18–21–7 || 43 || 
|- style="text-align:center; background:#fcc;"
| 47 || January 19 || Philadelphia || 4–7 || NY Islanders ||  || Emery || 16,170 || 18–22–7 || 43 || 
|- style="text-align:center; background:#cfc;"
| 48 || January 20 || Pittsburgh || 2–3 || Philadelphia || OT || Emery || 19,982 || 19–22–7 || 45 || 
|- style="text-align:center; background:#cfc;"
| 49 || January 27 || Arizona || 3–4 || Philadelphia || SO || Mason || 19,581 || 20–22–7 || 47 || 
|- style="text-align:center; background:#cfc;"
| 50 || January 29 || Winnipeg || 2–5 || Philadelphia ||  || Mason || 19,673 || 21–22–7 || 49 || 
|- style="text-align:center; background:#cfc;"
| 51 || January 31 || Toronto || 0–1 || Philadelphia ||  || Mason || 19,872 || 22–22–7 || 51 || 
|-

|- style="text-align:center; background:#ffc;"
| 52 || February 5 || NY Islanders || 3–2 || Philadelphia || SO || Mason || 19,042 || 22–22–8 || 52 || 
|- style="text-align:center; background:#cfc;"
| 53 || February 8 || Philadelphia || 3–1 || Washington ||  || Emery || 18,506 || 23–22–8 || 54 || 
|- style="text-align:center; background:#ffc;"
| 54 || February 10 || Philadelphia || 1–2 || Montreal || OT || Emery || 21,287 || 23–22–9 || 55 || 
|- style="text-align:center; background:#ffc;"
| 55 || February 13 || Philadelphia || 3–4 || Columbus || OT || Emery || 16,403 || 23–22–10 || 56 || 
|- style="text-align:center; background:#cfc;"
| 56 || February 15 || Philadelphia || 2–1 || Buffalo ||  || Emery || 18,759 || 24–22–10 || 58 || 
|- style="text-align:center; background:#fcc;"
| 57 || February 17 || Columbus || 5–2 || Philadelphia ||  || Emery || 19,082 || 24–23–10 || 58 || 
|- style="text-align:center; background:#ffc;"
| 58 || February 19 || Buffalo || 3–2 || Philadelphia || SO || Emery || 19,472 || 24–23–11 || 59 || 
|- style="text-align:center; background:#cfc;"
| 59 || February 21 || Nashville || 2–3 || Philadelphia || SO || Zepp || 19,680 || 25–23–11 || 61 || 
|- style="text-align:center; background:#cfc;"
| 60 || February 22 || Washington || 2–3 || Philadelphia ||  || Zepp || 19,703 || 26–23–11 || 63 || 
|- style="text-align:center; background:#fcc;"
| 61 || February 24 || Philadelphia || 1–4 || Carolina ||  || Zepp || 11,024 || 26–24–11 || 63 || 
|- style="text-align:center; background:#fcc;"
| 62 || February 26 || Philadelphia || 2–3 || Toronto ||  || Mason || 18,892 || 26–25–11 || 63 || 
|- style="text-align:center; background:#cfc;"
| 63 || February 28 || NY Rangers || 2–4 || Philadelphia ||  || Mason || 19,979 || 27–25–11 || 65 || 
|-

|- style="text-align:center; background:#ffc;"
| 64 || March 3 || Calgary || 3–2 || Philadelphia || OT || Mason || 19,513 || 27–25–12 || 66 || 
|- style="text-align:center; background:#cfc;"
| 65 || March 5 || St. Louis || 1–3 || Philadelphia ||  || Mason || 12,531 || 28–25–12 || 68 || 
|- style="text-align:center; background:#ffc;"
| 66 || March 7 || Philadelphia || 2–3 || Boston || OT || Mason || 17,565 || 28–25–13 || 69 || 
|- style="text-align:center; background:#fcc;"
| 67 || March 8 || Philadelphia || 2–5 || New Jersey ||  || Mason || 16,592 || 28–26–13 || 69 || 
|- style="text-align:center; background:#fcc;"
| 68 || March 10 || Dallas || 2–1 || Philadelphia ||  || Mason || 18,723 || 28–27–13 || 69 || 
|- style="text-align:center; background:#ffc;"
| 69 || March 12 || Philadelphia || 0–1 || St. Louis || SO || Mason || 19,600 || 28–27–14 || 70 || 
|- style="text-align:center; background:#cfc;"
| 70 || March 14 || Detroit || 2–7 || Philadelphia ||  || Mason || 19,701 || 29–27–14 || 72 || 
|- style="text-align:center; background:#ffc;"
| 71 || March 15 || Philadelphia || 1–2 || Ottawa || SO || Emery || 17,730 || 29–27–15 || 73 || 
|- style="text-align:center; background:#fcc;"
| 72 || March 17 || Philadelphia || 1–4 || Vancouver ||  || Mason || 18,870 || 29–28–15 || 73 || 
|- style="text-align:center; background:#fcc;"
| 73 || March 19 || Philadelphia || 1–4 || Calgary ||  || Mason || 19,289 || 29–29–15 || 73 || 
|- style="text-align:center; background:#ffc;"
| 74 || March 21 || Philadelphia || 4–5 || Edmonton || OT || Emery || 16,839 || 29–29–16 || 74 || 
|- style="text-align:center; background:#cfc;"
| 75 || March 25 || Chicago || 1–4 || Philadelphia ||  || Mason || 19,831 || 30–29–16 || 76 || 
|- style="text-align:center; background:#ffc;"
| 76 || March 28 || San Jose || 3–2 || Philadelphia || SO || Mason || 18,783 || 30–29–17 || 77 || 
|-

|- style="text-align:center; background:#cfc;"
| 77 || April 1 || Philadelphia || 4–1 || Pittsburgh ||  || Mason || 18,664 || 31–29–17 || 79 || 
|- style="text-align:center; background:#ffc;"
| 78 || April 4 || Philadelphia || 2–3 || Carolina || SO || Emery || 12,852 || 31–29–18 || 80 || 
|- style="text-align:center; background:#cfc;"
| 79 || April 5 || Pittsburgh || 1–4 || Philadelphia ||  || Mason || 18,435 || 32–29–18 || 82 || 
|- style="text-align:center; background:#cfc;"
| 80 || April 7 || NY Islanders || 4–5 || Philadelphia ||  || Mason || 17,927 || 33–29–18 || 84 || 
|- style="text-align:center; background:#fcc;"
| 81 || April 9 || Carolina || 3–1 || Philadelphia ||  || Emery || 17,348 || 33–30–18 || 84 || 
|- style="text-align:center; background:#fcc;"
| 82 || April 11 || Ottawa || 3–1 || Philadelphia ||  || Mason || 17,027 || 33–31–18 || 84 || 
|-

|-
| Legend:

Player statistics

Scoring
 Position abbreviations: C = Center; D = Defense; G = Goaltender; LW = Left Wing; RW = Right Wing
  = Joined team via a transaction (e.g., trade, waivers, signing) during the season. Stats reflect time with the Flyers only.
  = Left team via a transaction (e.g., trade, waivers, release) during the season. Stats reflect time with the Flyers only.

Goaltending

Awards and records

Awards

Records

Among the team records set during the 2014–15 season was single season franchise highs for most overtime losses (18), most shootouts (14) and most shootout losses (11).

Milestones

Suspensions and fines

Transactions
The Flyers were involved in the following transactions from June 14, 2014, the day after the deciding game of the 2014 Stanley Cup Finals, through June 15, 2015, the day of the deciding game of the 2015 Stanley Cup Finals.

Trades

Players acquired

Players lost

Signings

Draft picks

Below are the Philadelphia Flyers' selections made at the 2014 NHL Entry Draft, held on June 27–28, 2014 at the Wells Fargo Center in Philadelphia, Pennsylvania. The team finished the previous season ranked 13th in the league, but secured the 17th overall pick, ahead of the New Jersey Devils who were relegated to the 30th spot for attempting to circumvent the salary cap in 2010. The Flyers original third and fourth-round picks were traded to New York Islanders in two separate trades.

Farm teams
American Hockey League – Lehigh Valley Phantoms
ECHL – Reading Royals

Notes

References
General
 
 
 
Specific

Philadelphia Flyers seasons
Philadelphia Flyers season, 2014-15
Phil
Philadelphia
Philadelphia